Ben Het Camp (also known as Ben Het Special Forces Camp, Ben Het Ranger Camp and FSB Ben Het) is a former U.S. Army and Army of the Republic of Vietnam (ARVN) base northwest of Kon Tum in the Central Highlands of Vietnam. The camp was notable for being the site of a tank battle between the U.S. Army and the People's Army of Vietnam (PAVN), one of the few such encounters during the Vietnam War.

History

1966-71
The 5th Special Forces Group Detachment A-244 first established a base at Ben Het, then a hill tribe village, in the early 1960s to monitor North Vietnamese infiltration along the Ho Chi Minh Trail. The base was located approximately 13 km from the Vietnam-Laos-Cambodia tri-border area, 15 km northwest of Đắk Tô and 53 km northwest of Kon Tum.

In October 1967 Company C, 299th Engineer Battalion moved to Ben Het to build a C-7 capable airfield, with provision for expansion to accommodate the C-130. The camp was used to support the buildup of U.S. forces during the Battle of Dak To, with several battalions of the 173rd Airborne Brigade deploying there. The 299th Battalion later improved Route 512 from Đắk Tô Base Camp to Ben Het and expanded the airfield to accommodate C-130s.

In November 1968, a helicopter pilot from the 7th Squadron, 17th Cavalry Regiment reported four unidentified tanks west of the camp, but the report was never confirmed. The U.S. 4th Infantry Division had other reports of PAVN tanks in the area.

By early 1969, there were 12 Special Forces advisers and three companies of Civilian Irregular Defense Group (CIDG) numbering 400 men in total, with two M42A1 Duster self-propelled anti-aircraft guns and an artillery battery of M107 self-propelled guns. To counter a buildup of PAVN forces in the area, a unit of the 1st Battalion, 69th Armor Regiment, equipped with four M48 Patton tanks was sent to reinforce the camp. Three of the four tanks took up dug-in positions on a hill facing west towards Cambodia, while the last tank occupied a firing position in the main camp overlooking the resupply route.

Throughout February the PAVN attacked the camp by fire. The shelling decreased at the beginning of March, but at 21:00 on 3 March the PAVN shelling began again and men of the 1/69th Armor heard the sound of tank engines coming from the west. A PT-76 of the PAVN 16th Company, 4th Battalion, 202nd Armored Regiment detonated an antitank mine 1,100 meters to the southwest of the base, which alerted the camp and lit up the other PT-76s attacking the base. Flares were sent up, exposing the attacking tanks, but by sighting in on muzzle flashes, one PT-76 scored a direct hit on the turret of an M48, killing two crewmen and wounding the other two. Another M48, using the same technique, destroyed a PT-76 with their second shot. At daybreak, the battlefield revealed the wreckage of two PT-76s and one BTR-50 armored personnel carrier but no PAVN dead. Intelligence later revealed that the main object of the attack was to destroy the M107 guns.

The PAVN 28th and 66th Regiments continued to besiege the base from May to June 1969.

On 24 May 1969, the PAVN ambushed the 212th Company of the 1st Mobile Strike Force Battalion near Ben Het. Warrant Officer Class Two Keith Payne of the Australian Army Training Team Vietnam was awarded the Victoria Cross for his actions that day.

Other units stationed at Ben Het included:
6th Battalion, 14th Artillery

1972
Following the departure of the U.S. forces the base was used by the ARVN 85th Border Rangers.

Since January 1972 it had become clear that the North Vietnamese were building up for offensive operations in the tri-border region. ARVN forces had been deployed forward toward the border in order to slow the PAVN advance and allow the application of airpower to deplete PAVN manpower and logistics. To counter the possible threat from the west, two regiments of the ARVN 22nd Division were deployed to Tân Cảnh and Đắk Tô and the 1st Squadron, 19th Armored Cavalry Regiment equipped with M41 tanks was deployed to Ben Het. On 24 April, the PAVN 2nd Division, elements of the 203rd Tank Regiment and several independent regiments of the B-3 Front attacked Tân Cảnh and Đắk Tô rapidly overrunning both bases with their T-54 tanks. On 9 May 1972, elements of the PAVN 203rd Armored Regiment assaulted Ben Het. ARVN Rangers destroyed the first three PT-76 tanks with BGM-71 TOW missiles, thereby breaking up the attack. The Rangers spent the rest of the day stabilising the perimeter ultimately destroying 11 tanks and killing over 100 PAVN.

In early October 1972 the PAVN 320th Division focused attacks on the base, culminating on 12 October in a bombardment of some 1,500 rounds of artillery, rockets and mortars striking in and around the camp that destroyed the defenders' artillery, significant ammunition reserves and food supplies. PAVN ground assaults followed and the 300-man garrison reported initial casualties of 60 dead and 120 wounded. Over 100 airstrikes by fighter-bombers and B-52 bombers failed to stop the attacks and radio contact was lost with the defenders on the night of 12 October 1972. Approximately 140 survivors escaped the camp and evaded to the southwest, being observed by friendly aircraft the morning of 13 October. Airstrikes were employed to destroy equipment in the abandoned base. Prior to the bombardment, two American advisors were evacuated.

Current use
The base has been returned to farmland and housing.

References

Installations of the United States Army in South Vietnam
Installations of the Army of the Republic of Vietnam
Buildings and structures in Kon Tum province